Jaroslav Černý (22 August 1898 – 29 May 1970) was a Czech Egyptologist. From 1929 to 1946 he was a lecturer and docent at Charles University in Prague, from 1946 to 1951, the Edwards Professor of Egyptology at the University College, London. From 1951 to 1965, he was Professor of Egyptology at University of Oxford.

Early life
Jaroslav Černý was born on 22 August 1898 in Pilsen in Austro-Hungary (currently part of the Czech Republic). His family lived in Pilsen until 1913, then moved to Slaný. J. Černý continued his studies at a gymnasium in Pilsen until 1917.  
He studied from 1917 till 1922 at Charles University, where he received his doctorate in 1922, and his habilitation  in 1929.

Career
He took part in Bernard Bruyère's excavations at Deir el-Medina from 1925 to  1970 and the village became the focus of a lifelong study. One volume, of a planned three on the village, was published before his death with other parts published posthumously. 
He was sponsored by Tomáš Garrigue Masaryk from 1927, and worked with Alan Henderson Gardiner from 1934. In the 1930s, Černý participated in epigraphic missions across Egypt—at Sinai and Abydos.

He spent the Second World War in Cairo and London, from 1942 as an employee of the Czechoslovak Ministry of Foreign Affairs. 
In 1946, he became professor for Egyptology at University College London. From 1951 until 1965 he was Professor of Egyptology at Oxford University. His specialties were hieratic script, the New Kingdom, and Late Egyptian literature.

Death
He died on 29 May 1970 in Oxford, England, where he is buried in Wolvercote Cemetery.

Works
 Catalogue des ostraca hiératiques non littéraires de Deir el-Medineh, 7 Bände, Kairo 1937–70
 Ostraca hiératiques, Cairo 1931-1935. (Catalogue Général du Musée égyptien du Caire, 25501-25832.)
 Late Ramesside Letters, Brussel 1939.
 Répertoire onomastique de Deir el-Médineh, Kairo 1949. in collaboration with B. Bruyère and J. J. Clère.
 The Inscriptions of Sinai, London 1952, 1955. in collaboration with  Alan H. Gardiner and T. Eric Peet.
 Paper & Books in Ancient Egypt, London.
 Ancient Egyptian Religion, London 1952 (1952, 1957).
 Hieratic Ostraca, Volume I. Oxford 1957.
 Egyptian Stelae in the Bankes Collection, Oxford 1958.
 Hieratic Inscriptions from the Tomb of Tutankhamun, Oxford 1965.
 A Community of Workmen at Thebes in the Ramesside Period, Kairo 1973.
 A Late Egyptian Grammar, Rom 1975 (1978, 1984). in collaboration with  Sarah Israelit Groll, supported by von Christopher Eyre.
 Coptic Etymological Dictionary, Cambridge 1976.
 Papyrus hiératiques de Deir el-Médineh, Tome I. Kairo 1978. finished by Georges Posener.

Notes

References
 Jaromír Málek, "Life and achievements of Czech Egyptologist Jaroslav Cerný (1898–1970)". in Archiv Orientální 66 (1998), pp. 27–30.
 M. L. Bierbrier, The Tomb-Builders of the Pharaohs, American University in Cairo Press 1992,  p. 144
Jiřina Růžová, Písař Místa Pravdy (The Scribe in the Place of Truth), Libri 2011, 
Hana Navrátilová, "Jaroslav Černý (1898–1970): Egyptologist, diplomat and traveller". In Macková, Adéla Jůnova and Pavel Onderka (eds), Crossroads of Egyptology: the worlds of Jaroslav Černý, Prague: National Museum 2010, pp. 9–35.

1898 births
1970 deaths
20th-century archaeologists
Writers from Plzeň
Czech Egyptologists
Christian Peace Conference members
Professors of Egyptology (University of Oxford)
Burials at Wolvercote Cemetery
Charles University alumni